Margaret Diana Alexander, Countess Alexander of Tunis
  (née Bingham; 16 September 1905 – 17 August 1977) was a British aristocrat and charity activist who served as Vice-regal consort of Canada.

Born in Marylebone, she was the youngest of four children born to Lord Bingham (later the Earl of Lucan), and Violet Sylvia Blanche Spender-Clay, sister of Herbert Spender-Clay. She was educated at Notting Hill High School. On 14 October 1931, she married Harold Alexander. He was a future field marshal and was created Viscount Alexander of Tunis in 1946 and Earl Alexander of Tunis in 1952.

Owing to her husband's career, the family moved frequently, and they lived in 36 homes during their marriage, during which time she held several prominent roles. In 1946, on her husband's appointment as Governor General of Canada, she became vice-regal consort, and châtelaine  of Rideau Hall. In recognition of this she was made a Dame Grand Cross of the Order of the British Empire in 1954.

She held the office of Justice of the Peace for Berkshire from 1956 to 1975. In 1970, while living at Windsor Great Park, she was appointed a Deputy Lord Lieutenant of Berkshire, one of the first women to hold the role of JP.

Lady Margaret was active at the Women's Voluntary Service during the Second World War, working for the department in charge of evacuation of small children. She was Vice-Chairman of the WVS 1952–53 and served on the board of the English-Speaking Union from 1953 to 1971. Between 1960 and 1965, she established the Winston Churchill Memorial Trust at the ESU. She served as chairman of the Juvenile Court of Windsor County Division, and set up a probation hostel for young men in the area, visiting the hostel weekly from 1965 to 1976.

She died in Bracknell, Berkshire in 1977, aged 71.

Family and issue
The Alexanders had three children and adopted a fourth, Susan.

Lady Rose Maureen Alexander (born 28 October 1932), who married Lt. Col. Humphrey Crossman
Shane William Desmond Alexander, 2nd Earl Alexander of Tunis (born 30 June 1935)
Brian James Alexander  (born 31 July 1939), who is heir presumptive to the title
Lady Susan Mary Alexander (born 26 February 1948), married Andrew Paulet Hamilton

References

1905 births
1977 deaths
British countesses
Dames Grand Cross of the Order of the British Empire
Dames of Grace of the Order of St John
Canadian viceregal consorts
Daughters of Irish earls
People educated at Notting Hill & Ealing High School
Bingham family (Ireland)
Wives of knights